Maid for Each Other is a 1992 television film starring Nell Carter and Dinah Manoff. It was written by Manoff, Robb Gilmer, Les Alexander, Don Enright and Andrew Smith, produced by Enright and Alexander, and directed by Paul Schneider.

Plot
A recently widowed Beverly Hills socialite (Dinah Manoff) is left broke and homeless. Seeking refuge at her mother's home, she gains a job as a maid for a flamboyant jazz singer (Nell Carter). The two form an unlikely bond and soon find themselves neck deep in mayhem and trouble.

Soundtrack 
The song "Bad Case of You" which Nell Carter performs in the movie is not available in any other form apart from in this movie.

External links

1992 television films
1992 films
1990s crime comedy films
NBC network original films
American crime comedy films
Films directed by Paul Schneider (director)
1990s English-language films
1990s American films